The second 1977 ATP Buenos Aires was a men's tennis tournament held in Buenos Aires, Argentina that was part of the Grand Prix circuit and played on outdoor clay courts. It was the 11th edition of the tournament and was held from 21 November through 27 November 1977. First-seeded Guillermo Vilas won the singles title.

Finals

Singles

 Guillermo Vilas defeated  Jaime Fillol Sr. 6–2, 7–5, 3–6, 6–3
 It was Vilas's 19th title of the year and the 46th of his career.

Doubles
 Ion Ţiriac /  Guillermo Vilas defeated  Ricardo Cano /  Antonio Muñoz
 It was Tiriac's 6th title of the year and the 18th of his career. It was Vilas's 18th title of the year and the 45th of his career.

References

External links 
 ITF tournament edition details
 ATP tournament profile

Argentine Championships (Tennis), 1977
ATP Buenos Aires
ATP Buenos Aires
Argentine Champ
November 1977 sports events in South America